Cruger is a town in Holmes County, Mississippi, United States. Per the 2020 census, the population was 268.

Geography
Cruger is in the northwest corner of Holmes County, in the Mississippi Delta region along U.S. Route 49E.

Demographics

2020 census

Note: the US Census treats Hispanic/Latino as an ethnic category. This table excludes Latinos from the racial categories and assigns them to a separate category. Hispanics/Latinos can be of any race.

2000 Census
As of the census of 2000, there were 449 people, 161 households, and 112 families residing in the town. The population density was 462.5 people per square mile (178.7/km2). There were 177 housing units at an average density of 182.3 per square mile (70.5/km2). The racial makeup of the town was  74.16% African American 25.61% White and 0.22% Asian. Hispanic or Latino of any race were 2.23% of the population.

There were 161 households, out of which 33.5% had children under the age of 18 living with them, 32.3% were married couples living together, 30.4% had a female householder with no husband present, and 30.4% were non-families. 29.8% of all households were made up of individuals, and 16.1% had someone living alone who was 65 years of age or older. The average household size was 2.79 and the average family size was 3.46.

In the town, the population was spread out, with 32.1% under the age of 18, 10.0% from 18 to 24, 25.8% from 25 to 44, 15.1% from 45 to 64, and 16.9% who were 65 years of age or older. The median age was 32 years. For every 100 females, there were 89.5 males. For every 100 females age 18 and over, there were 77.3 males.

The median income for a household in the town was $15,417, and the median income for a family was $27,500. Males had a median income of $24,375 versus $22,813 for females. The per capita income for the town was $14,125. About 32.8% of families and 44.7% of the population were below the poverty line, including 50.7% of those under age 18 and 58.0% of those age 65 or over.

Education
The town of Cruger is served by the Holmes County School District.

Notable people
 Abie Ames, blues and jazz pianist
 Ray Roberts, former Major League Baseball pitcher
 Robert Curtis Smith, Piedmont blues singer, guitarist and songwriter

References

Towns in Holmes County, Mississippi
Towns in Mississippi